Koodi Vazhnthal Kodi Nanmai may refer to:
 Koodi Vazhnthal Kodi Nanmai (1959 film)
 Koodi Vazhnthal Kodi Nanmai (2000 film)